Anne F. Beiler is an American businesswoman and founder of Auntie Anne's pretzels.

Early life 
Beiler was born in Lancaster County, Pennsylvania, one of eight children born into an Old Order Amish family, on January 16, 1949. When she was three years old, her parents made the decision to join the Amish Mennonite church, meaning that, though the family retained many Amish practices, such as farming and using a horse and buggy, they were allowed limited use of modern amenities, such as electricity. She did not graduate from high school, instead leaving her studies after completing the 8th grade, as most Amish children did in that time.

Career 
In 1987, Beiler started making hand-rolled pretzels at a market stand in Maryland. She then rented a stand in February 1988 in Downingtown, Pennsylvania, and called it Auntie Anne's Pretzels. The Beilers decided to tweak the recipe and found success. Anne had no previous business experience and only a ninth grade education, but she had eight stand alone stores and her first Auntie Anne's Soft Pretzels store in a mall after a year. The only advertising the company had was the rave reviews from their customers. In 1989, the first Auntie Anne's franchises opened throughout Central Pennsylvania.

Written works 
In 2002, Beiler wrote a story book style autobiography entitled Auntie Anne: My Story with illustrations by artist Frieman Stoltzfus. In 2008, Beiler penned a memoir with her nephew, Shawn Smucker, entitled Twist of Faith: The Story of Anne Beiler, Founder of Auntie Anne's Pretzels published by Thomas Nelson Inc. Her third book, co-authored with Emily Sutherland, entitled, The Secret Lies Within: An Inside Out Look at Overcoming Trauma and Finding Purpose in the Pain was released by Morgan James Publishing in 2018. In 2021, she released Overcome & Lead, which she also co-authored with Emily Sutherland, detailing the leadership lessons learned while building the international Auntie Anne's Pretzel franchise.

Speaking 
Beiler delivered a speech at the 2008 Republican National Convention on September 3, 2008.

Personal life 
Beiler has two sisters, Fi and Becky, and is married to Jonas Z. Beiler, an author and family counselor, by whom she has three children, daughters LaWonna (born 1971), Angela Joy (1974–1975), and Joy LaVale (born 1976). Her middle daughter, Angela Joy Beiler, died at 19 months old, in a farming accident involving a Bobcat tractor driven by Beiler's sister Fi on the family's property in Pennsylvania. Jonas and Anne married in 1968, when she was 18 years old and he was 21. Like Beiler, her husband was raised in an Old Order Amish family. By LaWonna, she has three grandchildren, Trinity, Ryan, and Mia, and through her seven siblings, she has more than thirty nieces and nephews. Dyslexia affects several members of her family.

Beiler describes, in her memoir, her church's pastor having maintained secret sexual relationships with her and her sisters, and that he had also molested her daughter LaWonna.

Beiler holds two honorary doctorates, one from Elizabethtown College and another from the Eastern University, both schools located in Pennsylvania. Like most Amish children in her time, she did not complete high school but she did go onto obtain her G.E.D. at the age of 50.

Beiler also serves on the board of directors for the Museum of the Bible, affiliated with David Green, the founder of Hobby Lobby, which opened in 2017.

References

1949 births
Living people
Elizabethtown College alumni
People from Lancaster County, Pennsylvania
20th-century American businesspeople
20th-century American businesswomen
Pennsylvania Republicans
Businesspeople from Pennsylvania
21st-century American women